"Everyone's in Love with You" is a song written by Mike Love for the American rock band The Beach Boys. It was released on their 1976 album 15 Big Ones.  The subject of this song refers to the Maharishi. The song was later re-recorded in 2004 for Mike Love's abandoned Mike Love Not War album. The song was also played live by the Mike Love and Bruce Johnston led Beach Boys during their 2004 European tour. David Byrne sang it to Caetano Veloso in their 2012 Live at Carnegie Hall álbum.

Personnel

The Beach Boys
Al Jardine – backing vocals
Mike Love – lead vocals, backing vocals
Brian Wilson – ARP Solina String Ensemble
Carl Wilson – backing vocals, bass, guitar
Dennis Wilson – drums

Additional musicians
Ron Altbach – piano, harpsichord
Ed Carter – guitar
Steve Douglas – saxophone
Charles Lloyd – flute
Jay Migliori – saxophone
Toni Tennille – backing vocals
Maureen L. West – harp

References

1976 songs
The Beach Boys songs
Songs written by Mike Love
Song recordings produced by Brian Wilson